Michael Graham (born July 14, 1963) is a retired American basketball player.  He is known for his college career at Georgetown University, where he appeared on the cover of Sports Illustrated magazine after helping the Hoyas to the 1984 NCAA championship.

Graham, a 6'9" power forward from Spingarn High School in Washington, D.C., signed with future Hall of Fame coach John Thompson at Georgetown.  As a freshman in 1983–84, Graham became a key player for the Hoyas.  He provided rugged defense and rebounding, appearing in all but two of the team's 37 games – starting 17.  While his regular season statistics were pedestrian, Graham became a key player for the Hoyas in their quest for a national championship.  In the 1984 Final Four, Graham scored 22 points and grabbed 11 rebounds and led the Hoyas to a victory over the Houston Cougars for the national championship.  In the championship game, Graham scored 14 points on 7–9 shooting and was one of two Georgetown players to be named to the All-Final Four team along with Most Outstanding Player Patrick Ewing.  Following the championship win, Graham – whose fiery demeanor and shaved head were seen as personifying the Hoyas' aggressive playing style – appeared on the cover of Sports Illustrated magazine.

Following the championship season, Graham had academic difficulties and was suspended from the Georgetown team.  He ultimately transferred to the University of the District of Columbia in an attempt to play Division II basketball, but ultimately declared for the 1986 NBA draft without playing a game for the Firebirds.

Graham was drafted by the Seattle SuperSonics in the fourth round of the draft (76th pick overall), but did not make the Sonics' final roster.  He played several seasons in the Continental Basketball Association (CBA), for the Albany Patroons, Charleston Gunners, Wyoming Wildcatters, Rochester Flyers, Tulsa Fast Breakers and Columbus Horizon.  In his four CBA seasons, Graham averaged 7.8 points and 6.6 rebounds per game.  Graham also played in Europe and South America.

References

External links
College statistics and bio

1963 births
Living people
Albany Patroons players
American men's basketball players
Basketball players from Washington, D.C.
Charleston Gunners players
Columbus Horizon players
Georgetown Hoyas men's basketball players
Power forwards (basketball)
Rochester Flyers players
Seattle SuperSonics draft picks
Tulsa Fast Breakers players
Wyoming Wildcatters players